Nadzeya Astapchuk (Nadzeya Mikalayeuna Astapchuk; , Nadezhda Ostapchuk; born October 28, 1980) is a Belarusian shot putter. She briefly was designated the Olympic Champion in 2012, but was subsequently stripped of the title for failing a drug test and the gold medal was awarded to New Zealand shot putter Valerie Adams. She was World Champion in 2005, but in March 2013, the IAAF reported that her drug test sample from that event had been retested and found to be positive.

Astapchuk was initially designated as the bronze medallist at the 2008 Beijing Olympics (but was subsequently disqualified from that too, because of a doping violation), and was the World Indoor and European Champion in 2010. Her overall personal best of 21.70 m that year is the fourth best women's all-time distance indoors.  However, IAAF has subsequently disqualified all of her results since August 2005.  She is a four-time runner-up at the World Indoor Championships and a three-time World Championships silver medallist outdoors. She holds the Championship record for the former event, with her winning throw of 20.85 m in 2010. In continental competition, she was the 2005 European Indoor champion and came second at the 2006 European Athletics Championships. In addition to her withdrawn medals in Beijing and London, she was fourth at the 2004 Athens Olympics before the disqualification of Svetlana Krivelyova. Though upgraded to third place in Athens, the IOC declined to award her a bronze medal.

Career
Born in Stolin, she was initially interested in basketball but the lack of a local team left her unable to pursue the sport further. Astapchuk instead entered throwing events and her first international title came at the age of seventeen, as she won the shot put at the 1998 World Junior Championships in Athletics. She was dominant at the younger levels and won at the 1999 European Athletics Junior Championships and then the 2001 European Athletics U23 Championships.

She rose to top international level in the early 2000s, winning two consecutive silver medals at the IAAF World Indoor Championships and also finished as runner-up at the 2003 World Championships in Athletics. She finished fourth at her first Summer Olympics in 2004, but reached the peak of her discipline the following year, winning at the 2005 European Athletics Indoor Championships and then becoming 2005 World Champion. Her career became overshadowed by Valerie Adams, who succeeded her as World Champion in 2007, although she continued to win major medals, including silvers at the World Indoor and Outdoor Championships and a bronze medal at the 2008 Beijing Olympics.

Her personal best is 21.70 m thrown at the Belarusian championships in 2010, making her the third best indoor thrower on the all-time lists. She scored her first world indoor title at the 2010 IAAF World Indoor Championships, throwing a championship record of 20.85 m. She won further honours at the 2010 European Cup Winter Throwing meeting, easily winning gold ahead of compatriot Natallia Mikhnevich. She defeated the reigning champion, Natallia Mikhnevich, at the 2010 European Athletics Championships to claim her first outdoor European Championship. She won all six of the IAAF Diamond League meetings that she competed in that year, becoming the inaugural women's shot put trophy winner, and suffered just one defeat in the entirety of 2010 – a runner-up placing behind Valerie Adams at the 2010 IAAF Continental Cup.

She decided to miss the indoor section of 2011 and instead struck a balance between training and resting her left knee. She had endured ongoing pain in the joint but remarked "I didn’t want to do something radical and have surgery as there is no guarantee of a speedy recovery". Her first competition of 2012 came at the Belarusian indoor championships and she demonstrated her form with a world-leading mark of 20.70 m. She had a best throw of 20.42 m at the 2012 IAAF World Indoor Championships and this brought her the silver medal behind Adams.

Turning to the outdoor season, she won at the 2012 European Cup Winter Throwing and reached 20.53 m to win the first leg of the 2012 Diamond League in Doha. She managed only third at the Golden Gala at the end of May, but threw a Belarusian outdoor record of 21.13 m in Minsk two weeks later. She threw further in July, having marks of 21.32 m, then 21.39 m in Grodno. Immediately prior to the Olympics, she had a world-leading throw of 21.58 m.

During the 2020–21 Belarusian protests, Astapchuk became a member of the Coordination Council of Sviatlana Tsikhanouskaya.

Doping
Astapchuk won gold at the 2012 Summer Olympics in London, the day after which the President of Belarus, Alexander Lukashenko, awarded her the Third-class Order of the Fatherland in recognition of her “high professionalism, outstanding sports achievements and victory at the 30th Summer Olympic Games”. However, she was later disqualified from the medal for testing positive for a banned substance. She was tested twice, once on 5 August and again the following day after she had finished first. The IOC said both samples indicated the presence of the anabolic agent metenolone. New Zealand's Valerie Adams was subsequently awarded the gold. Russia's Yevgeniya Kolodko was moved up to win the silver medal (and was eventually disqualified for doping as well and stripped of her medal), and China's Gong Lijiao moved to take the bronze medal. She received a one-year ban after her coach, Alexander Yefimov, admitted to spiking her coffee with metenolone without her knowledge after being worried about her performance, stating that he thought the drug would be clear before the tests were administered.

In March 2013, Astapchuk was stripped of her 2005 World Championship title after samples from the 2005 event were retested by the IAAF. In 2014 IAAF announced that she was sanctioned to four years ineligibility, ending 14 August 2016, and that her results from 13 August 2005 to 12 August 2007 and since 5 August 2012 were annulled.

On 12 January 2017 it was announced that because of a doping violation she had been disqualified from the 2008 Olympic Games.

Achievements

References

External links
Tilastopaja profile

1980 births
Living people
Belarusian female shot putters
Athletes (track and field) at the 2004 Summer Olympics
Athletes (track and field) at the 2008 Summer Olympics
Athletes (track and field) at the 2012 Summer Olympics
Olympic athletes of Belarus
People from Stolin District
Doping cases in athletics
Belarusian sportspeople in doping cases
Competitors stripped of Summer Olympics medals
World Athletics Championships medalists
European Athletics Championships medalists
Athletes stripped of World Athletics Championships medals
Sportspeople from Brest Region